M. Keith Chen is a Chinese American behavioral economist. As of 2020, he is a tenured professor of economics at UCLA's Anderson School of Management.

Chen holds a Ph.D. in economics from Harvard University (2003). From 2003 to 2008 he was an assistant professor of economics at the Yale School of Management, and an associate professor there from 2008 until he transferred to UCLA in 2013 as Associate Professor.

Chen's research focuses on applied microeconomic theory. His Whorfian hypothesis on how languages might affect behavior has received attention outside academia.

He is married to Elisa Long, associate professor of operations management at UCLA.

Select publications

References

External links
UCLA profile
Primate Economics - Forbes, 2/14/2006
Richard Morin: Time In and Time Out - WP, February 2, 2006

American economists
UCLA Anderson School of Management faculty
Year of birth missing (living people)
Living people
Harvard Graduate School of Arts and Sciences alumni